"Jimmy Shoe" is a song by British rapper Fugative, released as a single in 2009.

Background
The song was written in 2009, the same year it was recorded and released. The concept of the song is just tongue-in-cheek, ridiculing the way women have an obsession with shoes. The title is a play on words, combining the word 'Shoes' with the name of the top designer brand name, Jimmy Choo.

Release
The single was released on 6 April 2009. It was fairly popular with teenagers and had mainly positive reviews. Despite this, it only managed to reach No. 179 on the UK Singles Chart.

Music video
The music video begins with Fugative in front of a car. It shows various shots of him, girls and him with girls. It has a total of one and a half million views on YouTube.

References

2009 songs
2009 singles
Fugative songs